José Quintero (born 27 July 2001) is a Venezuelan footballer.

Career 
A member of Orlando City's Club Development Academy system since 2016, Quintero made 55 appearances in his three seasons. He signed an academy contract with Orlando City's USL reserve affiliate Orlando City B ahead of the 2019 season and made his professional debut on 30 March 2019, starting in a 3–1 loss to FC Tucson in the season opener.

Career statistics 
As of 24 October 2020

References

External links 
 

2001 births
Living people
Venezuelan footballers
Venezuelan expatriate footballers
Venezuelan expatriate sportspeople in the United States
Association football midfielders
Expatriate soccer players in the United States
Orlando City B players
Soccer players from Orlando, Florida
Footballers from Caracas
USL League One players
21st-century Venezuelan people